Churchman typically refers to a member of the clergy.

Churchman or Churchmen may also refer to:

English Churchman, a family Protestant newspaper founded in 1843
Churchman (journal), an Evangelical Anglican academic journal, formerly known as The Churchman
Churchman (surname)
Churchman's, a former British cigarette manufacturer